Tracy Ogden King Tracy Ogden King (born November 9, 1960) is an American businessman from Uvalde, Texas, who has been since 1995 a Democratic member of the Texas House of Representatives from District 80. Beginning in January 2023, the revised District 80 includes these counties south of San Antonio: Dimmit, Frio, Uvalde, Atascosa, Zavala plus the rural portions of Webb County outside Laredo. He is the only Anglo Democrat from a heavily rural district. By contrast, there were eighty-five Anglo Democrats in the House in 1985, eighty-three in 1987, with fifty-six of those from primarily rural areas. King was initially elected to the House on November 8, 1994, when he unseated the one-term Democrat-turned-Republican incumbent Pedro G. Nieto. King received 15,072 votes (61.8 percent) to Nieto's 9,321 (38.2 percent). With his 2022 victory, King has been elected to a total of fourteen two-year terms.

Background

King graduated from Carrizo Springs High School in Carrizo Springs, the county seat of Dimmit County, Texas. He then attended Southwest Texas Junior College, and Texas A&M University at College Station, from which he received his Bachelor of Science in agricultural engineering. In 1983, King was employed by the Beltone Hearing Aid Center in San Antonio, which served sixteen counties in southwestern Texas. King purchased the Beltone center in 1987 and sold it in 2008. King and his wife, the former Cheryl Baker, originally from Hondo, the seat of Medina County, have two children, Katelyn Marie King and Clayton Baker King. King is a former trustee of the First United Methodist Church. He is a past president of the Uvalde Kiwanis Club. He is a former president of the Texas Hearing Aid Association. In the house, King currently serves as the Chairman of the House Committee on Natural Resources, member of the Energy Resources Committee, and is Chairman of the House Water Caucus.

Election of 2012 

King won renomination in the Democratic primary election held on May 29, 2012. In his forthcoming tenth term, King pledges to work further for expanded job opportunities, health care, public education, and veterans benefits. He also said that he opposes state tax increases and will pursue ways to improve the business climate in south Texas. In the primary, King faced Jerry Garza (born 1976), a former two-term member from District 3 of the Webb County Commissioner's Court, a former television reporter for KGNS-TV, the NBC affiliate in Laredo, and a former faculty member at Laredo Community College, where he began his own college studies. Garza had sought to become the second Democrat from Laredo in the state House. Garza, meanwhile, announced that he is returning in 2013 to television news reporting. Through April 18, 2012, King amassed $74,350 in campaign contributions, compared to $4,800 for Garza. Only 15 percent of King's contributions came from within District 80, but he did receive a contribution from wealthy Laredo businessman Steve LaMantia. Garza said that most of King's contributions came from lobbyists and political action committees beyond the district. After he defeated Garza in the primary, King ran unopposed in the November 6 general election.

Electoral history

References 

1960 births
Living people
Democratic Party members of the Texas House of Representatives
Methodists from Texas
Businesspeople from Texas
Texas A&M University alumni
People from Carrizo Springs, Texas
People from Zavala County, Texas
21st-century American politicians